'"Bee" is a song recorded by German singers Lena Meyer-Landrut and Jennifer Braun, composed by American-Israeli songwriter Rosi Golan, American singer-songwriter Mayaeni Strauss and Norwegian songwriter Per Kristian Ottestad. Both Braun and Meyer-Landrut released their versions of the song, but Meyer-Landrut's version outperformed Braun's, reaching number three in the German singles chart while Braun's version peaked at No. 21.

Jennifer Braun version

"Bee" was one of three songs performed by Jennifer Braun in the final of Unser Star für Oslo (Our Star for Oslo), the national pre-selection programme for Germany's entry to the Eurovision Song Contest 2010. However, the audience chose Braun's contender Lena Meyer-Landrut and her version of the song "Satellite" for the contest in Oslo. "Bee" was made available for digital download on 13 March 2010 and is also featured on Braun's maxi single "I Care for You". "Bee" subsequently charted in Germany, reaching a peak position of No. 21.

Credits and personnel
Lead vocals – Jennifer Braun
Producer – Per Kristian "Boots" Ottestad
Music – Rosi Golan, Per Kristian "Boots" Ottestad, Mayaeni Strauss
Lyrics – Rosi Golan, Per Kristian "Boots" Ottestad, Mayaeni Strauss
Label: USFO for Universal Deutschland

Chart performance

Lena Meyer-Landrut version

"Bee" was also performed by Lena Meyer-Landrut in the final of Unser Star für Oslo. However, the audience chose "Satellite" to be her designated song for the contest in Oslo. Meyer Landrut's version of "Bee" was also made available for digital download on 13 March 2010, and is featured on Meyer-Landrut's maxi single "Satellite". The song subsequently charted in Germany, Austria and Switzerland, reaching peak positions of #3, #26 and #27 respectively.

"Bee" is from Meyer-Landrut's debut album My Cassette Player, which was released on 7 May 2010.

Track listing

Credits and personnel
Lead vocals – Lena Meyer-Landrut
Producer – Per Kristian "Boots" Ottestad
Music – Rosi Golan, Per Kristian "Boots" Ottestad, Mayaeni Strauss
Lyrics – Rosi Golan, Per Kristian "Boots" Ottestad, Mayaeni Strauss
Label: USFO for Universal Deutschland

Charts

Weekly charts

Year-end charts

References

2010 singles
Lena Meyer-Landrut songs
2010 songs
Songs written by Rosi Golan